This is the discography documenting albums and singles released by American R&B/pop group, New Edition who sold over 20 million records worldwide. The group has released 7 studio albums, 2 holiday albums, 8 compilations and 29 singles (including 2 featuring singles).

Albums

Studio albums

Compilation albums

Christmas albums

Singles

Featured singles

References

Discographies of American artists
Rhythm and blues discographies